Siege of Ceuta may refer to:

Siege of Ceuta (1419)
Sieges of Ceuta (1694–1727)
Siege of Ceuta (1790–1791)

See also
Battle of Ceuta (disambiguation)